The Crow Creek Water Ditch is a historic water transportation system which brought water from Eureka Creek to where it was needed in gold placer mining in the Indian Creek drainage area where gold was discovered in 1866.  It is located near Townsend, Montana.  It was built between 1866 and c.1875 originally to support gold mining, which required water, then later was used for farm and ranch irrigation.

One section was a "spectacular"  wooden flume which brought it along walls of Hassel Canyon. It also included a  section where it ran down natural gullies where no digging was needed.

An approximately  portion of it--the two hand-dug sections--was listed on the National Register of Historic Places in 2001.  The listed area also includes remnants of a wooden flume, and a rubble stone dam.

In 1918 the Crow Creek Irrigation District was formed by farmers and ranchers for irrigation. With the creation of Canyon Ferry Lake the need for the canals decreased.

References

Industrial buildings and structures on the National Register of Historic Places in Montana
National Register of Historic Places in Broadwater County, Montana
Irrigation in the United States
Water supply infrastructure on the National Register of Historic Places
1866 establishments in Montana Territory